Night of the Demons is an American comedy-horror franchise consisting of four films. The original film, Night of the Demons, was released in 1988. Written and produced by Joe Augustyn, and directed by Kevin S. Tenney, the sequels have had various writers and directors attached to them, with the character of Angela Franklin remaining the only constant in all of the films in the franchise. Tenney, who directed the first sequel, also wrote the third film in the franchise and co-produced the remake.

Films

Original series

Night of the Demons (1988)
The first film in the series, Night of the Demons was released in 1988. The film was written and produced by Joe Augustyn and directed by Kevin S. Tenney. The film follows several teenagers as they attend a party thrown by school outcast Angela (played by Amelia Kinkade) and her best friend (scream queen Linnea Quigley) at an abandoned funeral home.

The film was picked up for theatrical release by Paragon Arts International. Rather than a nationwide release, it was released regionally, debuting in Detroit, Michigan, on September 9, 1988.

Night of the Demons 2 (1994)
Night of the Demons 2 was released in 1994, with the story picking up six years after the end of the previous film. The story follows the character of Angela's younger sister Melissa as she and several of her fellow students visit Hull House on Halloween. Unlike its predecessor, which took place entirely inside of the funeral parlor, the sequel has demonic activity occurring outside of the limits of the property on the school's campus.

The film was given a limited theatrical release in California by Republic Pictures from May 17, 1994.

Night of the Demons 3 (1997)
Night of the Demons 3 (also known as Demon House) is a 1997 sequel to the previous two films. Written by Kevin S. Tenney, the plot features several teens that find themselves on the run after a misunderstanding leading to a shoot out with police. They try to hide out at Hull House.

The film was given a limited theatrical release in California by Republic Pictures from October 7, 1997.

Remake series

Night of the Demons (2009)
Night of the Demons is a 2009 remake that was loosely based on the original 1988 film. The film takes place in a seemingly haunted mansion in New Orleans, with the plot following several adults rather than teenagers. It was directed by Adam Gierasch and produced by Kevin S. Tenney.

The film originally premiered at the London FrightFest in August 2009. Although it was originally scheduled to arrive in theaters, it was instead released straight-to-DVD/Blu-ray on October 19, 2010.

Night of the Demons: After-Party (TBA)
In June 2013, Kevin S. Tenney intended to create a sequel to the 2009 Night of the Demons film, subtitled "After-Party" and directed by Anthony Hickox. A Kickstarter campaign was launched with a goal of $250,000 but was unsuccessful, with the project remaining in development hell as of January 2023.

The projected plot for After-Party was to center on the character of Diana, one of Angela's former friends and associates, who would hold a party in the same mansion and become possessed by the now-demonic Angela.

Cast and characters
 A dark gray cell indicates that the character was not in the film or that the character's presence in the film has yet to be announced.
 An  indicates an appearance through archival footage or stills.
 A  indicates a cameo role.
 An  indicates a role shared with another actor.
 A  indicates an uncredited role.
 A  indicates a voice-only role.

Box office

References

External links
 
 
 
 
 
 

Night of the Demons
Films set in California
Comedy film series
Horror film series
Film series introduced in 1988